Barcelona International Women's Film Festival (Spanish: Mostra Films Dones Barcelona) is an exhibition platform established in 1993 with the aim of promoting women-led film. With year-round programming, Mostra projects work to highlight work of filmmakers from around the world, increasing the visibility of women's film culture, and showing the importance of women's contribution to audiovisual creation.

History  
The Barcelona International Women's Film Festival (also known as Mostra) was established in Barcelona in 1993, to promote and highlight films made by women, and to increase the visibility of women's contribution to audiovisual culture. Over twenty five years, the festival has become a cultural mainstay of the city, a launching pad for alternative creations, and a forum for discourse and debate on topics relating to women, film and the creative process. 

The festival is non-competitive, and for most of its history focused on experimental and documentary film, though it also screened fictional work. In 2013, the festival changed its format to include various "sections", including monographs, various themes and extra-short videos. According to organizers, "along this journey we have become debtors as well as heirs of the female filmmakers oeuvres" and for that reason, seek to share film "genealogies", whether new creations or rediscovering historic work of women.

The festival is supported by sponsors, as well as municipal and national institutions, including the City of Barcelona, and the Spanish Ministry of Culture. The festival also collaborates with local and national cultural institutes. Mostra also collaborates with other women's film festivals in Spain and elsewhere, such as the Festival International de Films de Femmes de Créteil.

See also 
 List of women's film festivals
 Women's cinema

References

External links 
 
 

Women's film festivals
Annual events in Spain
Film festivals established in 1993
Film festivals in Catalonia